Ian Dunbar (born April 15, 1947) is a veterinarian, animal behaviorist, and dog trainer. He received his veterinary degree and a Special Honours degree in Physiology & Biochemistry from the Royal Veterinary College (London University), and a doctorate in animal behavior from the Psychology Department at UC Berkeley, where he researched the development of social hierarchies and aggression in domestic dogs.

Career 
In 1982, Dunbar designed and taught the world's very first off-leash puppy socialization and training classes titled SIRIUS Puppy Training. Subsequently, he created and developed the San Francisco SPCA's Animal Behavior Department, the American Kennel Club's Gazette "Behavior" column, which he wrote for seven years, and the K9 GAMES, which were first held in San Francisco in 1993 and continue as annual events in Japan and France. He hosted the popular UK television series Dogs With Dunbar for five seasons and has appeared on numerous radio and television programs, including the Today Show (US) and Dash Village (Japan).

Over the past 35 years, Dunbar has given over 1000 seminars and workshops around the world for dog trainers and veterinarians in an effort to popularize off-leash puppy socialization classes, temperament modification, and owner-friendly and dog-friendly dog training. Additionally, Dunbar has consulted on a variety of movies—full-length features, documentaries and animation (including Pixar's UP) and he has twice spoken at the prestigious e.g. Conference.

After he founded the Association of Pet Dog Trainers in 1993, Dunbar was inducted into the Dog Fancy Hall of Fame along with four of his heroes, James Herriot, Konrad Lorenz, Lassie, and Balto. Currently, Dunbar is President of the Association of Pet Dog Trainers Foundation, Top Dog of the Center for Applied Animal Behavior and Vice President of dogstardaily, an online, multi-media puppy raising and dog training website.

He has authored numerous books and videos about puppy/dog behavior and training, including Before and After Getting Your Puppy, How To Teach A New Dog Old Tricks, and the SIRIUS Puppy Training video series.

Methods
Ian's dog training method focuses on rewarding positive behavior with affirmation and treats, rather than trying to correct negative behaviors through forced submission. His study of dog behaviour has led him to conclude that dogs seek out the attention of people and will do things that will earn them favor with humans. This an evolutionary trait that allowed them to co-exist and benefit from the scraps of food humans shared with them  He does not believe in asserting dominance over your dog, or that dogs should be actively punished if they do something wrong, rather dogs should be rewarded for correct behaviour. 

His dog training program typically starts by using treats and effusive praise to reward behaviour you want repeated. Once the dog is comfortable with the action, treats are slowly weened and only the use of positive affirmations are needed to keep the wanted behaviour. Since dogs need to repeat actions over and over before understanding a pattern, establishing a pattern of positive rewards for positive actions allows them to please their owners. He is also a proponent of crate training for puppies.

In 1982 Dunbar founded Sirius Dog Training, the first off-leash training program specifically for puppies. The program emphasizes the importance of teaching bite inhibition, early socialization, temperament training, and simple solutions for common and predictable behavior problems, as well as basic household manners, to dogs under six months of age.

Associations 

 In 1993, Dunbar founded the Association of Pet Dog Trainers (APDT) in Canada and the United States and arranged their first two annual conferences. The APDT is now the largest pet dog training organization in the world. Subsequently, Dunbar helped establish APDTs in the UK, Australia, Japan, France, and Spain.

 Dunbar is a member of the Royal College of Veterinary Surgeons, the American Veterinary Society of Animal Behavior, the California Veterinary Medical Association, the Sierra Veterinary Medical Association, and the Association of Pet Dog Trainers. He is also the vice président of the French association MFEC (Mouvement professionnel francophone des éducateurs de chiens de compagnie). The French association promote friendly and positive training with dog.

 Dunbar joined the Society for Veterinary Ethology (now the International Society for Applied Ethology) over 35 years ago, at which time he was the only member specializing in dog and cat behavior problems. Later, he was involved in the establishment of the American SVE (now the American Veterinary Society of Animal Behavior).

 For several years, Dunbar has been an honorary member of the International Association of Canine Professionals and has accepted entrance into their Hall of Fame.

Currently

Dunbar is currently Director of The Center for Applied Animal Behavior in Berkeley, California, where he lives with his wife Kelly, plus dogs Claude, Hugo, and Dune and cats Ugly and Mayhem. He is the founder of the Association of Pet Dog Trainers started in 1993. Dunbar also serves as a dog behaviorist expert  and on the advisory board for DogTime.com

Dunbar is also the founder of the K9 Games where he organizes those games at the international level worldwide. He promotes the K9 Games in Europe with Catherine Collignon, director of the company ANIMALIN.

References

External links 
 TED Talks: Ian Dunbar on dog-friendly dog training at TED in 2007

American veterinarians
Male veterinarians
Dog trainers
Living people
1947 births